Road to Power or The Road to Power is a book written by Karl Kautsky.

Contents 
In chapter 1 Kautsky argues that the time for revolution has not yet passed, as some on the Left alleged, most importantly Eduard Bernstein. Kautsky argued that the revolutionary energy of the bourgeoisie was channeled by Bismarck into a project to throw “a few German princes from their thrones”, overthrow the French Empire and support for Italian unification. The cooperation between the state and bourgeoisie that prevented revolution halted the development of the proletariat.

Kautsky continues to point out that in 1904 he predicted that workers would revolt in Russia, joining with the bourgeoisie to establish representative government, in 1905 a revolution led to Tsar to create the Duma, a Parliament. He proceeded to note and predict a continuation of a political awakening China, India, Egypt, Morocco, Persia and Turkey. He predicts that violent revolution is unlikely in Europe because of the strength of modern armies, except in Russia. 

In chapters IV & V Kautsky argues that Marxism is a historical determinism because the will itself is not free.

Impact
Road to Power had a large impact on the Bolsheviks and was used to justify the October Revolution.

References 

Karl Kautsky
1909 non-fiction books